The 2018 Liga 3 Jakarta is a qualifying round for the national round of 2018 Liga 3. Villa 2000 21 FC, the winner of the 2017 Liga 3 Jakarta are the defending champions. The competition will begin on July 20, 2018.

Group stage 
The 21 probable teams to compete are mentioned below.
This stage scheduled starts on 21 July 2018.

Group A

Group B

Group C

Group D

Knockout stage

References 

 

Liga Nusantara
3